Erlend Ormbostad (born 3 April 1981) is a retired Norwegian football defender.

He made his Eliteserien debut for Molde FK in August 2000 in a 7–1 thrashing of Bodø/Glimt. He later played several years in Skeid and briefly in Skeid's neighbor Årvoll.

References

1981 births
Living people
People from Sykkylven
Norwegian footballers
Molde FK players
Skeid Fotball players
Eliteserien players
Norwegian First Division players
Association football defenders
Norway under-21 international footballers
Sportspeople from Møre og Romsdal